Mandrin is a 1947 French historical adventure film directed by René Jayet and starring José Noguéro, Armand Bernard and Mona Goya. It is based on the life of the eighteenth century French brigand Louis Mandrin.

The film's sets were designed by the art director Louis Le Barbenchon. It was released in two separate parts, premiering five months apart entitled Le libérateur and La tragédie d'un siècle.

Cast
 José Noguéro as Mandrin
 Armand Bernard as Sansonnet
 Mona Goya as Madame de Pompadour
 Antonin Berval as Général La Morlière
 Aimé Simon-Girard as Ricord
 Philippe Mareuil a Patrice Aspremont
 Philippe Richard as Carcasse
 Émile Ronet as Cadet
 Jacqueline Carrel as Isabelle
 Joëlle Robin as Yolande 
 Charles Lemontier as 	L'abbé
 Ponzio as Baryton
 Julien Maffre as Un villageois
 Robert Pizani as Voltaire
 Hélène Pépée as La mère supérieure
 Paul Azaïs as Trognard
 Georges Vitray as Brochant d'Erigny
 Albert Broquin as Le cocher
 René Stern as Un laquais
 Roger Vincent as Soubise

See also
Mandrin (1924)
Mandrin (1962)

References

Bibliography 
 Klossner, Michael. The Europe of 1500-1815 on Film and Television: A Worldwide Filmography of Over 2550 Works, 1895 Through 2000. McFarland & Company, 2002.

External links 
 

1947 films
1940s historical adventure films
French historical adventure films
1940s French-language films
Films directed by René Jayet
Films set in the 18th century
Films released in separate parts
1940s French films